Qingdao (also spelled Tsingtao; ,) is a major city in eastern Shandong Province. The city's name in Chinese characters literally means "azure island". Located on China's Yellow Sea coast, it is a major nodal city of the Belt and Road Initiative  (BRI) that connects Asia with Europe. It has the highest GDP of any city in the province. Administered at the sub-provincial level, Qingdao has jurisdiction over seven districts and three county-level cities (Jiaozhou, Pingdu, Laixi). As of the 2020 census, Qingdao built-up (or metro) area made of the 7 urban Districts (Shinan, Shibei, Huangdao, Laoshan, Licang, Chengyang and Jimo) was home to 7,172,451 inhabitants making it the 15th largest city in China by population. Lying across the Shandong Peninsula and looking out to the Yellow Sea, it borders the prefecture-level cities of Yantai to the northeast, Weifang to the west and Rizhao to the southwest.

Qingdao is a major seaport and naval base, as well as a commercial and financial center. It is home to electronics multinationals such as Haier and Hisense. The Jiaozhou Bay Bridge, links the main urban area of Qingdao with Huangdao district, straddling the Jiaozhou Bay sea areas. Its historic German-style architecture and Tsingtao Brewery, the second largest brewery in China are legacies of the German occupation (1898-1914).
Qingdao is classified as a Large-Port Metropolis.

In the 2020 Global Financial Centers Index, Qingdao ranked 47th; the index is published by the Z/Yen Group and China Development Institute, the other Chinese cities on the list being Shanghai, Hong Kong, Beijing, Shenzhen, Guangzhou, Chengdu, Nanjing, Xi'an, Tianjin, Hangzhou, Dalian, and Wuhan. In 2007, Qingdao was named as one of China's top ten cities by the Chinese Cities Brand Value Report, which was released at the 2007 Beijing Summit of China Cities Forum. In 2009, Qingdao was named China's most livable city by the Chinese Institute of City Competitiveness. In 2018, Qingdao held the Shanghai Cooperation Organisation summit. In 2020, Qingdao was rated as a Gamma+ level global city by the Globalization and World Cities Research Network.

Qingdao is also one of the world's top 80 cities for global scientific research as tracked by the Nature Index. The city is home to several notable universities, including the Ocean University of China, China University of Petroleum, Shandong University of Science and Technology, Qingdao, Qingdao University of Science and Technology Qingdao University of Technology, and Qingdao Agricultural University.

History

Ancient times
Human settlement in the area dates back 6,000 years. The Dongyi nationality, one of the important origins of the Chinese nation, lived here and created the Dawenkou, Longshan and Dongyeshi cultures. In the Eastern Zhou Dynasty (770 B.C. – 256 B.C.), the town of Jimo was established, which was then the second-largest one in the Shandong region. The area in which Qingdao is located today was named Jiao'ao when it was administered by the Qing Dynasty on 14 June 1891.

German and Japanese occupations

In 1891, the Qing Empire decided to make coastal Tsingtao (then known as "Jiao'ao") a defense base against naval attacks and began to improve its fortifications. Imperial German naval officials observed and reported on this activity during a formal survey of Jiaozhou Bay in May 1897. Subsequently, German troops seized and occupied the fortification. The preindustrial, waning Qing Empire was forced to concede the area to Germany the following year, and the Kiautschou Bay concession, as it became known, existed from 1898 to 1914 (Li 2005, p. 81). Jiaozhou was alternatively romanized as Kiaochow, Kiauchau, or Kiao-Chau in English, and Kiautschou in German; Qingdao was its administrative center. "The so-called Marktstrasse (Market Street) was nothing more than the old main street of the Chinese village of Tsingtao, and the buildings lining it were the former homes of fishermen and farmers. Having sold their property, they resettled their homes and fields in the villages further east." Upon gaining control of the area, the Germans outfitted the impoverished fishing village of Tsingtao (Qingdao) with wide streets, solid housing areas, government buildings, electrification throughout, a sewer system and a safe drinking water supply, a rarity in large parts of Asia at that time and later. The area had the highest school density and the highest per capita student enrollment in all of China, with primary, secondary and vocational schools funded by the Imperial German treasury and Protestant and Roman Catholic missions. Commercial interests established the Germania Brewery in 1903, which later became the world-famous Tsingtao Brewery. German cultural and commercial influences extended to other areas of Shandong Province, including the establishment of diverse commercial enterprises.

Identified by the German authorities as a strategically important port, Qingdao was administered by the Imperial Department of the Navy (Reichsmarineamt) rather than the Imperial Colonial Office (Reichskolonialamt).  The growing Imperial German Navy based their Far East Squadron there, allowing the warships to conduct operations throughout the western Pacific. Beginning in January 1898, the marines of III. Seebataillon were based at Tsingtao. Construction of the Jiaoji Railway began on 23 September 1899, and was completed in 1904.

Before the outbreak of World War I (1914–1918), ships of the German naval forces under Admiral Count von Spee were located at central Pacific colonies on routine missions. The fleet then rendezvoused in the Marianas Islands to plan a transit back to Germany rather than be trapped in the Pacific by more powerful and numerous Allied fleets (British and Japanese).

After a minor British naval attack on the German concession in Shandong (Kiautschou Bay concession) in 1914, Japanese Empire troops occupied the city and the surrounding province during the Siege of Tsingtao after Japan's declaration of war on Germany in accordance with the Anglo-Japanese Alliance. China protested against Japan's violation of her neutrality but was not able to interfere in the military operations. The decision of the Paris Peace Conference and the Versailles Treaty negotiations not to restore Chinese rule over the previous foreign concessions in Qingdao after the Great War triggered the May Fourth Movement (4 May 1919) of anti-imperialism, nationalism and cultural identity in China.

The city came under Chinese rule in December 1922, under control of the Republic of China (R.O.C.) established in 1912 after the Chinese Revolution the year before. However, Japan maintained its economic dominance of the railway and the province as a whole. The city became a direct-controlled municipality of the ROC Government in July 1929.

Japan re-occupied Qingdao in 1938, a year after it expanded the Second Sino-Japanese War (1937–1945), (a precursor to World War II, 1939–1945) with its plans of territorial expansion into China's coast. Nationalist (Kuomintang) ROC forces returned after the Japanese surrender in September 1945. On 2 June 1949, during the Chinese Civil War and shortly before the founding of the communist People’s Republic of China on 1 October 1949 the city was taken by Chairman Mao Zedong and his troops.

Qingdao city planning and development

1898–1914
The development of the Tsingtao urban space during the German occupation (1898–1914) originated from the port. Mass urban construction began in 1898 with the relocation of Chinese dwellers along the coast. With the completion of such series of mass construction projects such as wharves, the Tsingtao-Jinan Railway Line, Tsingtao Railway Station and locomotive works, a city was starting to take shape. The area had the highest school density and highest per capita student enrollment in all of China, with primary, secondary and vocational schools funded by the Berlin treasury as well as Protestant and Roman Catholic missions. In 1910, the Germans drew up for the second time the city planning of Tsingtao (Warner 2001, p. 33). The former urban area was extended four times highlighted by the emphasis on the development of commerce and trade. Sun Yat-sen (1866–1925), leader of the Chinese Revolution of 1911 and subsequently first president of the Republic of China, visited the Tsingtau area and stated in 1912, "I am impressed. The city is a true model for China's future".

1914–1922
The development of Tsingtao urban space continued during the first Japan-occupation period (1914–1922). In 1914, Tsingtao was taken over by the Japanese and served as a base for the exploitation of natural resources of Shandong and northern China. With the development of industry and commerce, a "New City District" was established to furnish the Japanese colonists with commercial sections and living quarters, which suggested a striking contrast to the shabby houses in the local Chinese zones (Li 2007, p. 133). In the meantime, several schools, hospitals, and public buildings were constructed, followed by urban streets and intercity highways as well. The urban spatial layout continued to expand northward along the east bay area.

1922–1938
The development of Tsingtao urban space during the ROC-ruled period (1922–1938). This period saw the substantial progress of the urban development of Tsingtao. The government engaged itself in mass construction that gave birth to villa districts at the beach and bank groups in CBD. Plenty of public buildings and facilities for entertainment and sports were completed. By the year 1937, the urban population numbered 385,000(Lu 2001, p. 327). Tsingtao consequently distinguished itself as a prominent holiday resort and summer retreat.

1938–1945
The development of Tsingtao urban space during the second Japan-occupied period (1938–1945). Japanese armed forces returned to Tsingtao in 1938 and started to strive for the construction of the Greater Tsingtao in the following June. Accordingly, they worked out the city planning of the Greater Tsingtao and the City Planning of the Mother Town (Tsingtao City Proper), even though they had not had the opportunity to actualize either, respectively. The period in question did not witness much urban progress except for the logical construction of No. 6 Wharf, some Japanese residences, and a small number of roads and streets (Lu 2001, p. 339).

Postwar
After World War II, the KMT allowed Qingdao to serve as the headquarters of the Western Pacific Fleet of the US Navy in 1945; however, its headquarters were transferred to the Philippines sometime in late 1948. On 2 June 1949, the CPC-led Red Army entered Qingdao and the city and province have been under PRC control since that time.

Since the 1984 inauguration of China's open-door policy to foreign trade and investment, Qingdao has rapidly developed into an ultramodern port city. It is now the headquarters of the Chinese navy's northern fleet. An early example of the open-door policy occurred on 5 November 1984, when three United States Naval vessels visited Qingdao. This was the first US port call to China in more than 37 years.

Northern Qingdao, particularly Shibei, Licang, and Chengyang districts, are now major manufacturing centers. The city has recently experienced a strong growth period, with a new central business district created to the east of the older business district. Outside of the center of the city, there is a large industrial zone, which includes chemical processing, rubber, and heavy manufacturing, in addition to a growing high-tech area. Numerous local and national service companies, rather than manufacturers, are based in the city's southern district; this, as well as local wind patterns, allows Qingdao to enjoy clean, clear air year-round.

Administrative divisions

The sub-provincial city of Qingdao has 7 districts and 3 county-level cities:

Geographically, there are three districts (Shinan, Shibei, Licang) constituting a peninsula on the east coast of the Jiaozhou Bay as the core urban area, one (Chengyang) on the north coast and one (Xihai'an) on the west coast of the Yellow Sea.
 Defunct - Jiaonan city - merged into Huangdao District (December 2012)

Geography

Qingdao is located on the south-facing coast of the Shandong Peninsula. It borders three prefecture-level cities, namely Yantai to the northeast, Weifang to the west, and Rizhao to the southwest. The city occupies an area totaling , and stretches in latitude from 35° 35' to 37° 09' N and in longitude from 119° 30' to 121° 00' E. The populated sections of the city are relatively flat while mountains spur up within city limits and nearby. Of the total area of Qingdao, 15.5% is highland, while the foothill, plain, and lowland areas constitute 25.1%, 37.8%, and 21.7%, respectively. The city has a -long coastline. Five significant rivers exceeding  in length can be found in the region.

Climate
Qingdao has a temperate, four-season, monsoon-influenced climate that lies in the transition between the humid subtropical (Köppen Cwa) and humid continental (Köppen Dwa) regimes. Qingdao is located in the north temperate monsoon region and has a temperate monsoon climate. Due to the direct regulation of the marine environment, the city is influenced by the southeast monsoon and the currents and water masses from the ocean, so it also has significant maritime climate characteristics. Due to its proximity to the coast and location on a peninsula, compared to most inland areas of China, its spring is delayed by one month, and the annual diurnal temperature variation is only ; conversely, its fall is milder than inland areas in Shandong. Thus, swimming is possible for two months on either side.

During the summer months, the beaches of Qingdao are afflicted by massive algal blooms. The decomposing algae release large amounts of hydrogen sulfide gas, which produces an offensive "rotten egg" odor. Sea lettuce blooms, which are partially caused by seaweed farming in Jiangsu Province, led local officials to declare a "large-scale algae disaster" in 2013.

Demographics

Of the 10 million residents of Qingdao, 6.2 million reside in the Qingdao urban area. Another estimated 5 million live in other cities under Qingdao's jurisdiction. The annual birth rate is calculated around 76,507, with a birth rate of 10.15 per year per thousand, and a death rate of 6.32, both calculated on an annual basis. Living standards are among the highest of leading Chinese cities due to the strong export economy and relatively high family wages.

There is a large Korean community in Qingdao. By 2009, there were approximately 100,000 Koreans working, studying and living in Qingdao, which makes Qingdao the second in terms of Korean population in China, following Beijing which has about 200,000 Koreans.

Economy

In recent years, an important region in Eastern China, Shandong Province has seen substantial change in its economic landscape. Much of this development has been concentrated in Qingdao. Qingdao has seen rapid development. With an annual growth rate of 18.9 percent in 2006, the city's GDP reached 42.3 billion, ranking first in Shandong Province and tenth out of China's top 20 cities. GDP per capita comprised CN¥52,895 (US$7,616) in 2008. The GDP has grown steadily at an average pace of 16% annually. In 2006, Qingdao was ranked one of six "golden cities" by the World Bank, out of 120 Chinese cities assessed on factors including investment climate and government effectiveness. In 2018, Qingdao's GDP reached CN¥1200.15 billion, though it shrank a little in 2019.

Internationally, Qingdao is perhaps best known for its Tsingtao Brewery, founded by a German-British joint venture in 1903 that produces Tsingtao beer, the best-known Chinese export beer. It is also home to Haier, a large white goods manufacturer, and Hisense, a major electronics company. In 2002 guitar manufacturers Epiphone opened a factory in Qingdao.

In 1984 the Chinese government named a district of Qingdao a Special Economic and Technology Development Zone (SETDZ). Along with this district, the entire city had gone through amazing development of secondary and tertiary industries. Qingdao flourishes with foreign investment and international trade as an important trading port in the province. South Korea and Japan in particular made extensive investments in the city. Approximately 80,000 South Korean citizens reside there.

In terms of primary sector industries, Qingdao has an estimated  of arable land.  Qingdao has a zigzagging pattern coastline, and thus possesses an invaluable stock of fish, shrimp, and other sea resources.

Qingdao's wind power electricity generation performs at among the highest levels in the region.

Industrial zones
 Qingdao West Coast New District
 Qingdao Special Economic and Technological Development Area
 Qingdao Free Trade Zone
 Qingdao High-tech Industrial Zone
 Qingdao University Industrial Zone

Transport

Road 
These National Trunk Highway System (NTHS) Expressways begin or pass through in Qingdao. Expressways that begin in Qingdao are in Bold:
 G15 Shenhai Expressway (Shenyang, Liaoning-Haikou, Hainan)
 G18 Rongwu Expressway (Rongcheng, Shandong-Wuhai, Inner Mongolia)
 G20 Qingyin Expressway (Qingdao-Yinchuan, Ningxia)
Spur Route: G2011 Qingxin Expressway (Qingdao-Xinhe, Pingdu, Shandong)
 G22 Qinglan Expressway (Qingdao-Lanzhou, Gansu)

These provincial expressways begin in or pass through Qingdao. Expressways that begin in Qingdao are in Bold:
 S16 Rongwei Expressway (Rongcheng-Weifang)
 S19 Longqing Expressway (Longkou-Qingdao)
 S21 Xinwei Expressway (Xinhe-Weifang)
 S24 Weiqing Expressway (Weihai-Qingdao)

Other than Expressways, there are also National Highways that pass through or begin in Qingdao. National Highways that begin in Qingdao are in bold:
 G204 (Yantai-Shanghai)
 G206 (Yantai-Shantou)
 G308 (Qingdao-Shijiazhuang)
 G309 (Rongcheng-Lanzhou)

On 30 June 2011, the longest bridge over water opened in Qingdao. It would easily cross the English Channel and is almost three miles longer than the previous record-holder, the Lake Pontchartrain Causeway in the American state of Louisiana. Haiwan Bridge is supported by more than 5,000 pillars and costs about 10 billion yuan which is about 1.5 billion dollars. The bridge was designed by the Shandong Gausu Group and the construction lasted for four years. Haiwan Bridge cut the commute between the city of Qingdao and the sprawling suburb of Huangdao by 30 minutes. At least 10,000 workers toiled in two teams around the clock to build the bridge, which was constructed from opposite ends. On the same day, the Jiaozhou Bay Tunnel opened. The tunnel brought much convenience to people by supporting public buses and making transport between the two areas more convenient.

Marine 

Qingdao (official name: Qingdao port international co. ltd.) hosts one of the world's busiest seaports. Cooperative relations have been established with 450 ports in 130 countries worldwide. The port of Qingdao is part of the 21st Century Maritime Silk Road. In 2003, the annual cargo handling capacity exceeded 100 million tons for the first time. The number of containers reached  of cargoes.

By 2011, the port had become the world’s sixth-busiest by Total Cargo Volume, having handled  of cargo in that year. As of 2016, it was the 8th in the world in terms of TEUs (Twenty Foot Equivalent Units).

The Orient Ferry connects Qingdao with Shimonoseki, Japan. There are two ferry lines connecting Qingdao with South Korea. The New Golden Bridge II operates between Qingdao and Incheon, and the Blue Sea Ferry operates between Qingdao and Gunsan.

Qingdao port also includes a number of large adjacent ports including Dongjiakou.

Aviation 
The airport opened on August 12, 2021, as a replacement for Qingdao Liuting International Airport.

Intercity rail 

Qingdao's railway development picked up during the late 1990s. It is at the start of the Jiaoji Railway. Qingdao's city proper has some major railway stations, including Qingdao railway station, Cangkou railway station, Dagang railway station and Qingdao North railway station. Sifang railway station is now closed to passengers.

Services go to Beijing, Shanghai, Hefei, Jinan and Tianjin. The fastest train between Qingdao and Beijing is G206 / G205, which takes 2 hours and 58 minutes.

Domestic rail lines connect Qingdao with many cities in China, including Beijing, Lanzhou, Chengdu, Xi'an, Zhengzhou, Jinan and Jining.

Public transport

Qingdao's public traffic owns 5283 large and medium-sized buses, CNG buses .There are also 136 trolleybuses . All of the buses and trolleybuses can be accessed using the Qingdao Public Traffic IC Card, which uses radio frequencies so the card does not have to physically touch the scanner. After that, all public transportation companies use Qingdaotong Card, the last company that started to use this card is the Zhenqing bus company located in The West Coast New Area of Qingdao (original Huangdao Distinct) in 2019.

Non air-conditioned buses cost 1 yuan (excluding the tunnel bus), The volume of road passenger transport approaches 737 million per year. The Public Transport Brand of 'Ri-Xin Bus' is also known in China.

There are several taxi companies in Qingdao including Yiqing Company, Zhongqing Company, Jiaoyun Company, and, Huaqing Company.

Metro

After getting the approval from the State Council, the government announced on 18 August 2009 that Qingdao is ready to spend more than 29 billion yuan ($4.2 billion) before 2016 on its subway construction. Metro Line 3 is the first line in function and opened on 16 December 2015.

Tramway

The Qingdao Tram (official name: Modern tram demonstration line) of Chengyang District, Qingdao, is a tram system operating in Chengyang District, Qingdao, China. It opened in 2016. The Qingdao Public Transport Group Rail Bus Co., Ltd. is responsible for operation and management. The system is only composed of 1 tram line.

Culture

Architecture

There are a large number of German-style buildings in Qingdao's city center, a remarkable fact considering the German leased-territory period only lasted 16 years (1898–1914). The unique combination of German and Chinese architecture therein, combined with German demographic roots and a large Korean expatriate population, gives Qingdao a rather distinct atmosphere. An old saying described Qingdao as a city of "red tiles green trees, blue sky, and blue sea." This saying indeed gives a picture of a bird view of Qingdao. A larger number of areas in former foreign styles are well preserved. Although the new city area is under large-scale reconstruction, the old city area (especially the western part of Shinan District) still retains many traditional buildings.

Notable people
 Long Ding, American football kicker
 James R. Lilley, U.S. diplomat
 Ma Jian
 Ma Jun
 Xiao Hong
 Xiao Jun
 Duanmu Hongliang
 Zou Chenglu was born in Qingdao
 Erin Pizzey, (was born in Qingdao)
 Li Zhaoxing
 Zhang Ruimin
 Victoria Song (f(x))
 Huang Zitao (musician, actor)
 Huang Bo
 Zhang Jike
 Gao Fenghan
 Toshiro Mifune (was born in Qingdao)
 Li Cunxin
 Huang Xiaoming
 Chen Hao
 Xia Yu
 Fan Bingbing (born in Qingdao)
 Bai Baihe
 Hao Haidong
 Wang Dong (midfielder for Qingdao Huanghai)
 Bu Xiangzhi (chess grandmaster)
 Zhang Juanjuan (archer)
 Malcolm H. Wiener, (was born in Qingdao)
 Ni Ping
 Tang Guoqiang
 Ren Jialun
 Chen Meng

Movies shot in Qingdao
 A Little Red Flower 2020
 A Better Tomorrow 2018 2016
 The Great Wall 2016
 Underdog Fight 2008
 Underdog Fight II 2013
 Ocean Heaven 2010
 Beauty Remains 2005

Language
During the city's leased-territory days, German, the official language, was rigorously taught and promoted. Since the demise of Germany's colonial empire after World War I, the German language is all but gone, leaving little impact on the local languages. A local accent known as Qingdao dialect distinguishes the residents of the city from those of the surrounding Shandong province. Due to the efforts by the city government to promote standard Mandarin, most educated people can speak standard Mandarin in addition to their native dialect. With reform policies and English teaching, some young citizens have been taught English and many can converse with English-speaking foreigners. Business and traffic signs in English are becoming more and more common.

Festivals
Notable festivals include:
 Qingdao International Horticultural Exposition 2014 is the biggest international fair that has been held in the history of the city.
 Qingdao International Beer Festival in August/September, held annually since 1991.

Media
Qingdao previously had a large German community and a German garrison, so three German newspapers operated in Qingdao. German papers included Deutsch-Asiatische Warte (weekly newspaper published until 1906, included Die Welt des Ostens, Altes und Neues aus Asiens drei Kaiserreichen, a cultural supplement), the Tsingtauer Neueste Nachrichten and the Kiautschou Post (a daily paper published from 1908 to 1912, referring to the Kiautschou (Jiaozhou) Bay concession). German publishing in Qingdao ended after World War I and the beginning of the Japanese administration.

A 1912 publication of the United States Department of Commerce, Bureau of Foreign and Domestic Commerce said that the Tageblatt für Nordchina of Tianjin was read in Qingdao and that major newspapers from Shanghai were also read in Qingdao.

Bandao Broadcasting Media Corporation, a news and broadcasting agency was founded in 1999.

Tourism
Qingdao attracts many tourists due to its seaside setting and temperate weather. Parks, beaches, sculptures, and unique German and modern architecture line the shore.  Its centrally located tourist information center, the "Qingdao Information Center for International Visitors for International Visitors," is located on Middle Hong Kong Road.

Qingdao's major attractions include:

Western Shinan district
 Zhan Qiao (Pier)
 Little Qingdao Isle
 Tian Hou Temple, Qingdao Folk Museum
 Badaguan, the older area of town with some surviving German and Japanese architecture.
 Lu Xun Park, named after Lu Xun, modern Chinese writer and critic, who lived and taught in the 1930s.
 Zhongshan Park, named after the style name 'Zhongshan' of Sun Yat-sen, a famous modern Chinese politician.
 Xiao Yu Shan
 The twin-spired St. Michael's Cathedral, a notable example of Qingdao's famous Neo-romanesque architecture, designed by German architect Alfred Fräbel, completed in 1934.
 Qingdao Aquarium
 Jiaozhou Governor's Hall, the office building of former German governors (Gouverneurspalast) and former municipal government
 Xinhao Hill

Eastern Shinan district
 May Fourth Square (Platz des vierten Mai), Coastal plaza with the Wind of May sculpture
 Tsingtao Brewery (Tsingtao-Brauerei), founded by Germany and the most exported beer from China.
 Zhanshan Temple (Dschanschan-Tempel), Qingdao's oldest Buddhist temple.

Laoshan district
 National Shilaoren Tourist Resort, the famous bathing beach symbolized by a characteristic natural sea rock with a shape like an old man
 Xiaomaidao Park, the park with hills, a beach, and a nice view of the coastal line

Education

Higher education

Qingdao is home to a large number of higher education institutions. The Ocean University of China, formerly called the Ocean University of Qingdao, is the most important university of maritime sciences in China. In addition, the Qingdao University, Qingdao University is ranked No. 940 among Best Global Universities. Schools are ranked according to their performance across a set of widely accepted indicators of excellence.  the Qingdao University of Science and Technology as well as the Qingdao Technological University have also been integral parts of higher education in Qingdao for decades. Shandong University Qingdao (SDUQ) was established in 2016, belonging to Shandong University System. Other institutions include:
 China University of Petroleum, completed its relocation from Dongying to Qingdao in 2012
 Shandong University of Science and Technology, the main campus is based in Qingdao since 2003
 Qingdao Agricultural University, the main campus is based in Qingdao since 2007
 Qingdao Technical College
 Qingdao Binhai University, located at Huangdao.

Shandong University was located in Qingdao from 1909 to 1936. A new branch campus of the university is under construction in Aoshanwei Town, Jimo.

International schools
 Korean International School of Qingdao
 Malvern College Qingdao
 Pegasus California School, Qingdao
 International School of Qingdao
  Qingdao Amerasia International School
  Qingdao No.1 International School
  Qingdao Oxford International College
  Yew Chung International School of Qingdao
  Belt&Road Collaborative Innovation College (BRCIC)

Secondary schools
 Qingdao No. 2 High School
 Qingdao No. 58 School
 Qingdao No. 1 High School
 Qingdao No. 9 High School
 Qingdao No. 15 High School
 Qingdao No. 19 High School
 and so on

Sports

Stadiums
 Guoxin Gymnasium (Qingdao city sports center)
 Yizhong Sports Center
 Qingdao Tiantai Stadium
 Hongcheng Stadium

2008 Olympic Summer Games
During the 2008 Summer Olympics, Qingdao and Beijing cohosted the Olympic Sailing competitions. In Qingdao, the events took place along the shoreline by the city. These events were hosted at the Qingdao International Sailing Centre and held in Fushan Bay, near the city's central business district. An international broadcasting center and purpose-built hotel were constructed for the Games.

Motorsport
The IndyCar Series signed a contract with the Qingdao city council to hold an IndyCar race in Qingdao in 2012. The subsequently canceled race was supposed to take place on a  street circuit.

Sister cities
Qingdao has 36 sister cities.

See also

 List of twin towns and sister cities in China
 Shandong
 Qingdao Oriental Movie Metropolis

Notes

References

Citations

Sources 

 Gottschall, Terrell D. By Order of the Kaiser: Otto von Diederichs and the Rise of the Imperial German Navy 1865–1902. Annapolis: Naval Institute Press. 2003. 
 Schultz-Naumann, Joachim. Unter Kaisers Flagge: Deutschlands Schutzgebiete im Pazifik und in China einst und heute [Under the Kaiser’s Flag, Germany’s Protectorates in the Pacific and in China then and today]. Munich: Universitas Verlag. 1985.
 Miscellaneous series, Issues 7–11. United States Department of Commerce, Bureau of Foreign and Domestic Commerce, 1912.
 Walravens, Hartmut. "German Influence on the Press in China". In: Newspapers in International Librarianship: Papers Presented by the Newspaper Section at IFLA General Conferences. Walter de Gruyter, 1 January 2003. , .
 Also available at the website of the Queens Library – This version does not include the footnotes visible in the Walter de Gruyter version.
 Also available in Walravens, Hartmut, and Edmund King. Newspapers in international librarianship: papers presented by the section of the newspaper at IFLA General Conferences. K.G. Saur, 2003. , .

External links 

 Qingdao Government website 
 Qingdao International Academician Port website 
 Study in China Admission System（中国高等院校国际招生管理服务系统） website 

 
Populated coastal places in China
Port cities and towns in China
Populated places with period of establishment missing
Prefecture-level divisions of Shandong